The Secret Lovers (lit. "Secrets Between a Man and a Woman"), also known as A Man and a Woman, is a 2005 South Korean television series starring Han Ji-hye, Kim Suk-hoon, Song Seon-mi and Kwon Oh-joong. It aired on MBC from August 29 to November 1, 2005 on Mondays and Tuesdays at 21:55 for 20 episodes.

Plot
Seo Young-ji is ashamed of her poor upbringing and works hard to better herself. She goes to see a plastic surgeon, hoping that by changing her appearance she will feel better about herself. The surgeon, Jung Ah-mi, asks her for a favor: Ah-mi's parents have set her up on a blind date with Kim Joon-woo, but she isn't interested and wants Young-ji to go in her place. Young-ji agrees, and she and Joon-woo hit it off. However, when Joon-woo discovers that Young-ji isn't Ah-mi, and in fact has a poor family to look after, he dumps her.

Before dating Joon-woo, Young-ji was also recently dumped by Choi Do-kyung, a poor, but ambitious social climber. Do-kyung will do anything to marry a rich woman, and he falls for Ah-mi. But although Ah-mi also wants to get married soon, she has her own secrets to hide.

Cast
Han Ji-hye as Seo Young-ji 
Kim Suk-hoon as Kim Joon-woo 
Song Seon-mi as Jung Ah-mi 
Kwon Oh-joong as Choi Do-kyung 
Joo Hyun as Seo Dal-goo 
Kim Dong-hyun as Seo Young-goo
Hwang Bo-ra as Seo Young-min 
Lee Jung-gil as Kim Jung-suk 
Ahn Hae-sook as Ms. Song 
Hyun Young as Kim Joon-mi
Ahn Jae-hwan as Lee Moon
Lee Byung-jin as Lee Sung-wol 
Seo Yeon-joo as Yang Jae-soon

References

External links
The Secret Lovers official MBC website 

MBC TV television dramas
Korean-language television shows
2005 South Korean television series debuts
2005 South Korean television series endings
South Korean romance television series
Television series by Pan Entertainment